The Finnish national road 52 is the 2nd class main route between the city of Raseborg and the municipality of Jokioinen in southwest part of Finland. It runs overall 111 kilometers from the Ekenäs town in Raseborg passing through the town centers of Salo and Somero to the Haapaniemi village and the national road 10 in Jokioinen.

Route 

The road passes through the following localities:
Raseborg (Ekenäs, Gennarby, Tenala and Olsböle)
Salo (Pakapyöli, Perniö, Salo, Pohjankylä, Veitakkala and Pertteli)
Somero (Somero, Sylvänä, Paltta and Koivumäki)
Jokioinen (Haapaniemi)

References

External links

Roads in Finland